The Hearst Tower is a building at the southwest corner of 57th Street and Eighth Avenue, near Columbus Circle, in the Midtown Manhattan neighborhood of New York City. It is the world headquarters of media conglomerate Hearst Communications, housing many of its publications and communications companies. The six lowest stories form the Hearst Magazine Building (also known as the International Magazine Building), designed by Joseph Urban and George B. Post & Sons, which was completed in 1928. Above it is the Hearst Tower addition, which was completed in 2006 and designed by Norman Foster.

The building's main entrance is on Eighth Avenue. The original structure is clad with stone and contains six pylons with sculptural groups. The tower proper contains a glass and metal facade arranged in a diagrid, which doubles as its structural system. The original office space in the Hearst Magazine Building was replaced with an atrium during the Hearst Tower's construction. The tower is certified as a green building as part of the Leadership in Energy and Environmental Design (LEED) program.

The Hearst Magazine Building's developer, William Randolph Hearst, had acquired the site for a theater, in the belief that the area would become the city's next large entertainment district, but subsequently changed his plans to allow a magazine headquarters there. The original building was developed as the base for a larger tower that was postponed due to the Great Depression. A subsequent expansion proposal during the 1940s also failed. The New York City Landmarks Preservation Commission designated the facade of the original building as a city landmark in 1988. Hearst Communications, having considered expanding the structure again in the 1980s, finally developed its tower during the first decade of the 21st century.

Site
The Hearst Tower is on the border of the Hell's Kitchen and Midtown Manhattan neighborhoods of New York City, two blocks south of Columbus Circle. It is bounded by 56th Street to the south, Eighth Avenue to the east, and 57th Street to the north. The building faces Central Park Place to the north, 3 Columbus Circle to the northeast, and Random House Tower to the east. It is also one block south of Time Warner Center and 2 Columbus Circle. The base of the Hearst Tower carries the alternate addresses 951–969 Eighth Avenue, 301–313 West 56th Street, and 302–312 West 57th Street.

The Hearst Tower is near an artistic hub that developed around a two-block section of West 57th Street between Sixth Avenue and Broadway during the late 19th and early 20th centuries, following the opening of Carnegie Hall at Seventh Avenue in 1891. The area contained several headquarters of organizations such as the American Fine Arts Society, the Lotos Club, and the ASCE Society House. Although the original Hearst Magazine Building was just outside the artistic hub, its proximity to these institutions was one factor in the selection of its location.

Architecture
The original six-story structure, known as the Hearst Magazine Building or the International Magazine Building, was designed by architect Joseph Urban and architecture firm George B. Post & Sons. Completed in 1928 and intended as the base of a future tower, the Hearst Magazine Building was designed in an early form of the Art Deco style. Henry Kreis designed six sculptural groups at the third story. The Hearst Magazine Building is the only survivor of an unbuilt entertainment complex that its developer, Hearst Communications founder William Randolph Hearst, had envisioned for Columbus Circle in the early 20th century. The tower, designed by Norman Foster, was completed in 2006, almost eight decades after the base was built. The Hearst Corporation and Tishman Speyer developed the tower, while WSP Global was the structural engineer and Turner Construction was the main contractor.

The base occupies nearly the whole lot and originally contained floors arranged in a "U" shape, flanking a courtyard to the west. Along much of the base, the third through sixth stories are slightly set back from the lowest two floors. The tower stories are more deeply set back from the lowest six floors on the north, east, and south sides.

The Hearst Tower has  of office space. In exchange, the Hearst Corporation agreed to improve access to the subway station directly underneath, adding three elevators and reconfiguring the subway station's circulation areas. Without the zoning amendment, the Hearst Corporation might have had to pay up to $10 million for additional air rights, as the company had already utilized all the unused air rights above the Hearst Magazine Building.

Facade

Base 

It is divided horizontally into the two lowest stories, three intermediate stories, and a sixth-story attic. The base's northeastern and southeastern corners are chamfered. A balustrade runs in front of the third-story windows, supported by a shelf with notches, and interrupted by the chamfered corners. A parapet runs above the fifth story, except in the bays above the entrance arches on Eighth Avenue and 57th Street, and at the chamfered corners. With the construction of the Hearst Tower, the base's existing facade was retrofitted to meet updated city seismic codes. Because the original office space was replaced with the atrium in the Hearst Tower's construction, the windows on the third through sixth stories of the facade illuminate the atrium.

The main entrance, at the center of the Eighth Avenue elevation, contains a large archway flanked by a pair of smaller rectangular doorways. The archway has gray granite panels at its base, and voussoirs and a beveled keystone at its top, overlapping with a balcony. The barrel-vaulted vestibule inside the archway contains embossed octagonal coffers. The far western end of the vestibule contains an entrance with a bronze frame and four glass doors beneath a bronze-and-glass transom. There is a subway entrance on the right (north) side of the Eighth Avenue entrance vestibule. On either side of the entrance arch, the Eighth Avenue elevation contains glass and metal storefronts at ground level, and seven sash windows at the second stories. On 57th Street, there was formerly a secondary entrance, which was altered to create a storefront topped by a window. There is another subway entrance to the left of the original doorway. The remainder of the ground-story facades at 57th and 56th Streets also contain glass and metal storefronts, although there are loading docks on the far western section of the 56th Street facade.

The base contains six pylons, which are supported by stone pedestals with sculptural groupings at the third story, and are topped by sculpted urns above the sixth story. The pylons indicate that the building was originally planned as a theater structure. The centers of the Eighth Avenue and 57th Street facades each contain two pylons and are identical. The left pylon on both entrances contains sculptural groups of "Comedy and Tragedy", while the right pylon contains sculptural groups of "Music and Art". Similar pylons rise in front of the northeast and southeast corners of the base. The northeast-corner pylon contains a group representing "Printing and the Sciences", while the southeast-corner pylon contains a group representing "Sport and Industry".

Between the pairs of pylons on Eighth Avenue and on 57th Street, at each of the third through sixth stories, is a tripartite window with fluted stone spandrels. The Eighth Avenue and 57th Street elevations contain seven bays on either side of the vertical bay, which are set back above the second story. The windows on the third through fifth stories of these elevations are sash windows, slightly recessed behind the main facade, while the sixth-story windows are flush with the cast stone facade. The setback and window arrangement are carried around to the easternmost eight bays on 56th Street. The westernmost two bays on 57th Street, and the westernmost twelve bays on 56th Street, do not set back above the second story, and do not contain third-story balustrades. On the western section of the 56th Street facade, the third through fifth stories are grouped into six pairs, which are separated by pilasters. The pilasters were designed to emphasize the long-unbuilt upper stories.

Tower 

A clerestory wraps around the seventh through tenth floors, atop the base, structurally separating the tower stories from the base. Above the tenth floor, the tower's facade uses a triangular framing pattern known as a diagrid, which serves as the structural support system for the tower stories. The diagrid divides the tower's sides horizontally, into segments of four stories, and diagonally, into alternating upright and inverted triangles, which intersect at "nodes" along various points of the facade. There are no vertical columns within the tower's footprint. The arrangement of the diagrid creates chamfered "birds' mouths" at the tower's corners at the 14th, 22nd, 30th, and 38th floors. According to The New York Times, the beams and "birds' mouths" run at a 75-degree angle to the horizontal floor slabs, though another author cites the beams as running at a 65-degree angle.  The structural system, similar to the Commerzbank Tower in Frankfurt and 30 St Mary Axe in London, was developed in conjunction with Ysrael Seinuk.

The triangles comprising the diagrid are prefabricated panels, manufactured by the Cives Steel Company at two plants in New York and Virginia. The columns are bolted, rather than welded, to each other at the nodes. The diagrid required  of structural steel, twenty percent less than what would have normally been required for a building of similar size. More than ninety percent of the steel in the diagrid is recycled. The exterior curtain wall was constructed by Permasteelisa, which mounted 3,200 glass panels on the facade.

Because of the facade's intricate design, the tower's window cleaning rig took three years and $3 million to plan. The resulting design incorporates "a rectangular steel box the size of a Smart car" on the roof, which hoists a  mast and a hydraulic boom arm. Sixty-seven sensors and switches are housed in the box. A window cleaning deck hangs from the hydraulic boom arm, supported by six wire-rope strands. The rig snapped in a 2013 incident that trapped two window cleaners.

Features

Structural features 
The Hearst Magazine Building is supported by steel columns at its perimeter. The original framework was intended to support at least seven additional stories. Urban's original plans for the tower no longer exist but, by some accounts, would have been up to 20 stories tall. The Hearst Magazine Building also had six elevator shafts, double or triple the expected number of elevators for a building of its size. As completed, there was a white-brick penthouse above the sixth story for the future expansion of the elevators. The Hearst Magazine Building's entire original framework was removed when the Hearst Tower was constructed in the 2000s. The existing structure was hollowed out to create the atrium for the expanded building, and new columns were installed behind the existing facade. Large "mega columns" extend downward from the perimeter of the tower addition. The existing frame and new columns are connected with beams at the third and seventh stories. Additionally, there are eight  "super-diagonals" sloping from the third floor to the tenth floor.

The Hearst Tower contains twenty-one elevators in total. The stairways and elevators are placed in a service core along the western portion of the tower, the only side that does not face a street. The original plan had called for the core to be at the tower's center, but it was redesigned after the September 11 attacks in 2001, as a security precaution against possible attacks from the street. The offset core also enables the office floors to contain an open plan without interior columns. To accommodate the offset service core, and to compensate for the lack of interior columns, the tower's weight is supported by the exterior diagrid, which is braced with the service core.

The underlying layer of bedrock beneath the Hearst Tower varies in depth, so the Hearst Tower's foundation was built using two methods. Beneath half of the site, the rock layer is a few feet beneath the basement, and spread footings are used. Under the other half of the site, where the rock layer descends a maximum of  beneath the basement, twenty-one caissons were installed.

Interior

The Hearst Magazine Building initially contained office space with  ceilings, which was replaced with a  atrium when the tower was built. The lobby, accessed by escalators from the Eighth Avenue entrance, was placed inside what had been the third story of the original building. The escalators run through a  waterfall called Icefall, which uses recycled water from the building's green roof. The waterfall is complemented by a  fresco painting, Riverlines, by artist Richard Long. Also within the atrium are two mezzanines; one contains a 380-seat cafeteria and the other houses an exhibition area. The cafeteria, called Cafe 57, is used by Hearst employees and visitors. On the northern side of the atrium is a screening room.

The floors were designed to contain many of Hearst's publications and communications companies, including Cosmopolitan, Esquire, Marie Claire, Harper's Bazaar, Good Housekeeping, and Seventeen. Besides Hearst offices, the tower contains a fitness center for staff on the 14th floor. There are also executive rooms on the 44th floor.

The tower has several design features that are intended to meet green building standards as part of the Leadership in Energy and Environmental Design (LEED) program. The limestone-clad floor slabs of the atrium and office floors contain polyethylene tubes that can carry heated or chilled water to regulate temperature and humidity. A  tank in the basement collects rainwater from the building's roof, some of which is pumped through Icefall in the lobby. The furniture and lights were also designed to be energy-efficient. Two executive stories have daylight dimming systems, which dim when there is sunlight, while the other office stories have daylight switching systems, which turn off when there is sunlight. Furthermore, about 85 percent of the material from the old building's interior was recycled for use in the tower's construction.

History 
W. R. Hearst moved to New York City in 1895 and became a successful magazine magnate over the following three decades. Almost immediately upon moving to the city, Hearst had envisioned the creation of a large Midtown headquarters around Columbus Circle, in the belief that the area would become the city's next large entertainment district. From 1895 to the mid-1920s, Hearst bought several large plots around the circle for his headquarters. Hearst had also envisioned that Manhattan's Theater District would be extended to Columbus Circle, having become interested in theater in part because of his mistress, actress Marion Davies. During the early 20th century, Hearst had hired Joseph Urban for several theater projects, and the two men became close friends.

Original development 
By early 1924, Hearst had obtained an option to acquire a 200-by-200-foot site along Eighth Avenue from 56th to 57th Street, close to the 57th Street art hub. That April, he acquired the property title to the site. Hearst gradually acquired large amounts of land around the intersection of Eighth Avenue and 57th Street, though none of the other sites were developed. Simultaneously with Hearst's purchases, Metropolitan Opera director Otto Hermann Kahn had started planning a new opera house to replace an existing building at 39th Street and Broadway, spending $3 million in late 1925 to acquire the site immediately west of Hearst's lot. Plans for the 57th Street opera house were made public in January 1926. but the Met abandoned these plans two years later.

In conjunction with the canceled opera house, Hearst had originally planned to construct a two-story office and retail building with a 2,500-seat theater, designed by Michael Bernstein. This was subsequently changed to a six-story office and theater building, to be designed by Thomas W. Lamb. Hearst's magazines were slated to be published three blocks west, on a block bounded by 11th and 12th Avenues between 54th and 55th Streets. By August 1926, the 11th Avenue site was abandoned, and Hearst had replaced Lamb, hiring Urban to design a magazine headquarters on the Eighth Avenue site. Because the proposed magazine headquarters was to be a skyscraper, Hearst also hired George B. Post & Sons, who had experience erecting skyscrapers. 

Excavation of the Hearst Magazine Building had started by June 1927. At the time, the section of Eighth Avenue between 42nd and 59th Streets was seeing rapid development, with surrounding realty values having increased 200 percent since the beginning of the decade. This was, in part, due to the development of the Independent Subway System's Eighth Avenue Line and zoning regulations that allowed for the development of skyscrapers on that part of Eighth Avenue. By January 1928, the Hearst Magazine Building was nearly completed. The Hearst Magazine Building ultimately cost $2 million (equivalent to $ million in ).

Hearst Magazine Building 
Shortly after the Hearst Magazine Building's completion, Urban and Post drew up plans for a new 1,000-seat concert hall to be built at street level, with a 600-seat secondary auditorium in the basement, to be completed by 1929. The Hearst Corporation acquired the land under the building in 1930 for $2.25 million or $2.5 million. However, with the onset of the Great Depression shortly after the Hearst Magazine Building's completion, planning for its upper stories stalled for over a decade. The New York Evening Journal Inc., one of Hearst's newspapers, transferred ownership of the building to Hearst Magazines Inc. in 1937, at which point the building was valued as being worth $3.253 million. This was part of a reorganization of properties owned by the Hearst Corporation. By that point, Hearst owed $126 million (equivalent to $ billion in ) and was in the process of selling off his holdings. Hearst considered issuing $35.5 million debt, in part to repurchase the Hearst Magazine Building, but ultimately withdrew his proposal.

In 1945, George B. Post and Sons prepared plans for nine additional stories. Plans were filed with the New York City Department of Buildings the following year, at which point the tower was slated to cost $1.3 million. However, the additional stories were never completed. The Hearst Magazine Building remained largely untouched throughout the 20th century, except for the replacement of the storefronts at ground level in 1970.

The Hearst Corporation resumed planning for a tower atop the Hearst Magazine Building in the early 1980s. At the time, the building had just been restored. During much of that decade, the Hearst Corporation rapidly acquired media concerns such as magazines, publishers, and television stations. In 1982, the New York City Landmarks Preservation Commission (LPC) started considering city-landmark designation for the Hearst Magazine Building. Further discussions of landmark status occurred in 1987, and the LPC finally granted landmark status to the building's facade the next year. The landmark designation meant that the LPC had to approve any proposed changes to the Hearst Magazine Building's exterior. Beyer Blinder Belle proposed a 34-story green-glass tower during the late 1980s, but this plan did not progress.

Tower addition 

The Hearst Magazine Building was ultimately too small to house all of the Hearst Corporation's divisions, despite being the company's headquarters. By the beginning of the 21st century, the building contained the Good Housekeeping offices, corporate offices, and Hearst's media division, while Hearst's other magazines were published in several buildings nearby. Accordingly, in 2000, the Hearst Corporation announced plans to consolidate all its divisions by completing its long-delayed tower. Planning for the tower had been fueled in part by the development of other media headquarters nearby, such as the planned New York Times Building and the Condé Nast Building at 4 Times Square. Hearst supposedly met with Polshek Partnership early in the planning process.

In February 2001, the Hearst Corporation announced that it had hired Norman Foster to design a tower addition. Foster's selection, which followed his failed bid to design the New York Times Building, led one architect to say: "My guess is Hearst wanted to outdo the Times." In spite of the September 11 attacks later that year, the Hearst Corporation decided to proceed with the project. Foster said that the board felt that, "If we don't do anything, [the terrorists] have won". However, as a result of the attacks, Foster and Hearst decided to restrict visitor access to part of the atrium and relocate the tower's core away from the street. Other parts of the design were also reviewed, but the glass facade was retained. Foster's team ultimately designed more than one hundred plans for the tower. Foster filed plans for the construction of the Hearst Tower that October, and the LPC approved the tower one month later. Hearst had consulted with the community to allay any concerns and opposition, so the approval took a relatively short three hours. The only major opponent was the Historic Districts Council, whose executive director said the tower "does not respond to, respect, or even speak to its landmark base".

The Hearst Tower was the first major skyscraper in Manhattan to be built after the September 11 attacks. Prior to the start of construction, Good Housekeeping moved to another Hearst Corporation structure, and two thousand employees were relocated. Work on the Hearst Tower started on April 30, 2003. The Hearst Magazine Building's interior was demolished during mid-2003. The original framework was left intact until new steel beams were installed, while the landmark facade was preserved and cleaned for $6 million. Steel construction began in March 2004. The floor slabs were erected at an average rate of one floor every four days, while the curtain wall was installed at a rate of one floor every six days.  The Hearst Tower topped out on February 10, 2005. 

Although the first employees moved into the tower in the last week of June 2006, it was not officially completed until that October. In total, the Hearst Tower had cost $500 million. Shortly after completion, the Hearst Tower became the first New York City building to receive a LEED Gold certification for its overall design. Because of the building's environmental features, its operating costs were 25 percent lower than in a typical skyscraper of the same size. The LEED certification was upgraded to Platinum in 2012.

Reception
Prior to the Hearst Tower's construction, the Hearst Magazine Building was regarded as an indication of unexecuted plans. One witness, writing to the LPC in 1982, said that the structure was designed "an unusual style, by an unusual [and unusually talented] designer". Architectural writer Eric Nash wrote in 1999 that the Hearst Magazine Building, as it stood before the Hearst Tower's completion, was "a tantalizing vision of what might have been". Two years later, in 2001, Herbert Muschamp of The New York Times characterized Urban's original building as having a "peculiar pastiche", saying, "Urban, himself a hybrid of architect and stage designer, should have been an ideal choice to bridge the two areas. The result, however, was leaden." Christopher Gray, also for the Times, wrote that "the Hearst building looked as much like some Wagnerian funerary monument as the headquarters of a publishing empire." William Randolph Hearst, the building's developer, left little indication about what he thought the Hearst Magazine Building represented, stating in a 1927 telegram that it was "an account of conspicuous architectural character".

Critics also highlighted the newer tower's contrast with the older base. A writer for Newsday stated that the tower demonstrated "the effect of one era's modern architecture giving birth to another's", saying that Foster's tower "seems to float above and behind the original shell." The Financial Times wrote, "There is no attempt to harmonise or grow organically from Urban's oddity [...] On the other hand the old building has not been ignored—quite the opposite." Nicolai Ouroussoff of The New York Times said, "Past and present don't fit seamlessly together here; they collide with ferocious energy", characterizing the Hearst Tower's design as "deeply comforting". Architectural writer Paul Goldberger, in The New Yorker, praised the Hearst Tower as the "most beautiful skyscraper to go up in New York" since 140 Broadway was completed in 1967. Not all critics were positive: Robert Campbell wrote in Architectural Record that the tower was designed "as if the Pentagon, with its usual deftness of touch, had confused its maps and located this chunk of military hardware in Manhattan instead of Florida." Muschamp, of the Times, said the new building resembled a "glass square peg in a solid square hole". 

The Hearst Tower addition received the 2006 Emporis Skyscraper Award, citing it as the best skyscraper in the world completed that year. In addition, the tower received a British Construction Industry Award in 2007 and was a runner-up for the Royal Institute of British Architects' Lubetkin Prize. In 2016, the Hearst Tower received the 10-Year Award from the Council on Tall Buildings and Urban Habitat, which cited the tower's "structural complexity" as a consideration in its value and performance.

See also

 Art Deco architecture of New York City
 List of New York City Designated Landmarks in Manhattan from 14th to 59th Streets

References

Notes

Citations

Sources

External links

 
 

1928 establishments in New York City
2006 establishments in New York City
Eighth Avenue (Manhattan)
Foster and Partners buildings
Hearst Communications
Hell's Kitchen, Manhattan
High-tech architecture
Leadership in Energy and Environmental Design gold certified buildings
Mass media company headquarters in the United States
Modernist architecture in New York City
New York City Designated Landmarks in Manhattan
Office buildings completed in 1928
Office buildings completed in 2006
Skyscraper office buildings in Manhattan
Skyscrapers on 57th Street (Manhattan)